Constancio Miranda Weckmann (born 15 September 1952) is a Mexican archbishop of the Roman Catholic church, currently serving as head of the archdiocese of Chihuahua. In the past he was also the bishop of Atlacomulco, as well as briefly serving as the apostolic administrator of the Diocese of Parral in June 2012.

Personal life
Miranda Weckmann was born on 15 September 1952 in the small settlement of Cruces in the state of Chihuahua in Northern Mexico.

Religious life
Miranda Weckmann carried out his priestly studies at the seminary of the Missionaries of the Nativity of Mary in León, Guanajuato, and later at the seminary of Ciudad Juárez the regional seminary of the north in Chihuahua. He was ordained a priest on 30 September 1977 by the then Bishop-prelate Justo Goizueta Gridilla O.A.R. as a secular priest for the Diocese of Cuauhtémoc-Madera. After his ordination he was sent to Rome where he was a student of the Pontifical Mexican College and graduated with a degree in Moral Theology at the Pontifical Alfonsina Academy.

As Bishop
On 27 June 1998 Miranda Weckmann was appointed to be bishop of the diocese of Atlacomulco. He was ordained a bishop on 4 August 1998, and consecrated by then-apostolic nuncio to Mexico Justo Mullor García. The co-consecrant were Ricardo Guízar Díaz, Archbishop of Tlalnepantla and Juan Guillermo López Soto, bishop of Miranda's home diocese of Cuauhtémoc-Madera.

As Archbishop
On 29 September 2009, it was announced that Miranda Weckmann was chosen by Pope Benedict XVI to be the next archbishop of Chihuahua to replace José Fernández Arteaga, who had reached the mandatory age of retirement of 75. Miranda Weckmann was installed as archbishop of Chihuahua on 19 November 2009.

References

1952 births
Living people
People from Chihuahua (state)
21st-century Roman Catholic archbishops in Mexico
20th-century Roman Catholic bishops in Mexico